The Indian state of Tripura borders with Bangladesh and the Indian states of Assam and Mizoram. The area of modern Tripura was ruled for several centuries by the Manikya dynasty of the Twipra kingdom. It was a princely state during British rule, and joined the newly independent India. Ethnic strife between the indigenous people and Bengali population led to tension and scattered violence since its integration into the country, but the establishment of an autonomous tribal administrative agency and other strategies have led to peace. Tripura was divided into four districts but with effect from 21 January 2012 four more new districts was divided making a total of eight districts in the state.

History
Dating back to the time of Mahabharata, the very helm of the Kingdom of Tripura encompassed the greater part of Eastern Bengal stretching from the Bay of Bengal in the South to the Brahmaputra in the North and west and Burma, now Myanmar in the East. The earliest trace of the ancient of Tripura can be found in the Ashokan pillar inscriptions.
The 17th century is a major watershed in the history of Tripura when the administration of the region passed on the hands of the Mughals with some powers left with the Manikyas. In the Colonial era, the Britishers extended their control over Tripura granting some limited independence to the Manikya kings. The region was under the rule of the Twipra Kingdom for centuries, although when this dates from is not documented. The Rajmala, a chronicle of Tripuri kings which was first written in the 15th century, provides a list of 179 kings, from antiquity up to Krishna Kishore Manikya (1830–1850), but the reliability of the Rajmala has been doubted. The Royal history of Tripura ended when the princely state acceded to the Indian Union on 15 October 1949. After death of the last king Maharaja Bir Bikram Kishore Manikya on 17 May 1947, a Regency Council was formed headed by Maharani Kanchan Prabha Devi, for aid of the minor Prince, Kirit Bikram Kishore Manikya Bahadur. The regent signed the merger agreement with the Government of India. After merger Tripura became a Part ‘C’ State. On reorganization of the states, effected in November, 1956, Tripura became a Union Territory with an Advisory Committee to aid and advise the Chief Commissioner. Thereafter in place of the Advisory Committee, a Territorial Council was formed through the adult franchise on 15 August 1957. On 1 July 1963, the Tripura Territorial Council was dissolved and the Legislative Assembly with the existing members of the Territorial Council was formed. On 21 January 1972 Tripura became full-fledged State by the Act of Parliament called the North Eastern Areas (Reorganization) Act, 1971.

Former administrative structure

New list of Districts after the reorganization
For administrative purposes, the state has been divided into 8 districts, 23 subdivisions and 58 development blocks—with effect from 21 January 2012, after a Government of Tripura Decision, out of which the newly created districts are 4, subdivisions 6, development blocks 5. The four new Districts are Gomati, Khowai, Sipahijala and Unakoti; the six new sub-divisions are Jirania, Mohanpur, Kumarghat, Panisagar, Jampuijala and Karbook; the five new development blocks are Yuvarajnagar, Durga Chawmuhani, Jolaibari, Silachari and Lefunga.

The information here are latest updated as of 25 May 2015.

Demographics
The following is a list of the basic demographic data for the districts of Tripura based on the size of the district's area, arranged in descending order (The data input here is taken from 2011 Census; however, the new four districts were formed in 2012 so information on those are of 2012.)

References

External links

 http://www.tripura.gov.in/

 
Districts
Tripura